Henry Francis Gammidge (1915–1981), was a writer of the James Bond comic strip that appeared in Daily Express newspaper and syndicated worldwide. Gammidge adapted Ian Fleming's James Bond novels, which were then drawn by illustrator John McLusky. Gammidge worked on eleven stories, which were published from 15 December 1958. Gammidge's last story was published on 8 January 1966.

References

Bibliography

 
 

1915 births
1981 deaths
English cartoonists
English comics writers